The following is an incomplete list of choral festivals, which encapsulates music festivals focused on choral music. The topic will have some or complete overlap with the list of opera festivals, list of early music festivals, and list of Bach festivals.

Festivals

See also

Choral music
 List of opera festivals
List of maritime music festivals
List of Christian music festivals

References

External links
 

 
Choral